The 2011 PGA Tour was the 44th season since the Tour became independent from the PGA of America. The season consisted of a total of 49 sanctioned events running from early January to late November. The schedule was announced on December 2, 2010 and had four phases:
 Regular season – Consisted of 37 events (one less than in 2010) and started on January 6 with the limited-field Hyundai Tournament of Champions (known as the SBS Championship in 2010) and ended with the Wyndham Championship on August 21.
 FedEx Cup Playoffs – As in previous seasons, this was a series of four tournaments. It started with The Barclays on August 25 and ended with the Tour Championship on September 25.
 Fall Series – After the Tour Championship, the principal portion of the season ended with a series of four tournaments (down from five in the previous season). These tournaments, generally passed on by elite players, offer an additional opportunity for players to secure their tour cards for the following season by finishing in the top 125 on the money list, or to gain a two-year exemption by winning a tournament with a slightly weaker field than usual.
 After the main season, the tour went into an Asia-Pacific swing consisting of four events, none of which offered official prize money.
 The CIMB Asia Pacific Classic Malaysia, a limited-field event held in Malaysia that debuted in 2010.
 The WGC-HSBC Champions, a World Golf Championships event held in China. Founded in 2005, it was elevated to WGC status in 2009, when it also became an event on the PGA Tour schedule. Although the prize money is unofficial, it now counts as an official PGA Tour win, if it is won by a PGA Tour member.
 The 2011 Presidents Cup, a biennial team competition involving a United States side and an "International" side drawn from non-European players (European players play against the USA in the Ryder Cup). This was held in Melbourne, Australia.
 The Omega Mission Hills World Cup, a team event featuring two-man teams from countries around the world and also held in China. This was be the first World Cup of the event's new biennial schedule; it had been an annual event through 2009.

The regular season included all four major championships and three of the World Golf Championships events. All four majors and all four WGC events were also sanctioned by the European Tour.

Changes for 2011
In late 2009, after the 2010 schedule had been announced, it was noted by golf media that most of the Tour's contracts for sponsorship of individual tournaments were locked in through that season. However, it was speculated that the expiration of those sponsorship contracts in 2011 would see substantial changes in the PGA Tour landscape.

As it turned out, the 2011 schedule was largely the same as in 2010. The number of official money events was reduced by one with the demise of the Turning Stone Resort Championship, but the tour's total prize money remained virtually the same.

The Tour announced several changes from the 2010 schedule. Apart from the aforementioned demise of the Turning Stone Resort Championship, switches in scheduling of existing tournaments, and changes in sponsorships, the most important changes were:

FedEx Cup off week 
The off week for the FedEx Cup playoffs, which had previously been the week prior to the Tour Championship, moved to the week before the BMW Championship. This alleviated concerns about a short turnaround after the second playoff event, the Deutsche Bank Championship, which was the only tournament on the schedule that normally ended on Monday (specifically on Labor Day).

WGC-Accenture Match Play Championship final 
The final of the WGC-Accenture Match Play Championship was reduced from 36 holes to 18.

Fall Series 
With the move of the Viking Classic into the regular season, specifically opposite The Open Championship, the Fall Series was reduced to four events.

Schedule
The following table lists official events during the 2011 season.

Unofficial events
The following events were sanctioned by the PGA Tour, but did not carry FedEx Cup points or official money, nor were wins official.

Location of tournaments

Money leaders
The money list was based on prize money won during the season, calculated in U.S. dollars.

Awards

Source:

See also
2011 European Tour
2011 Nationwide Tour
2011 Champions Tour

Notes

References

External links
Schedule on the PGA Tour's official site
2011 PGA Tour at ESPN

PGA Tour seasons
PGA Tour